This is a list of seasons completed by the Illinois Fighting Illini men's basketball program since the team's inception.

Seasons

 The team was retroactively named the national champion by the Premo-Porretta Power Poll.
 Jamall Walker coached the last three games of the 2016–17 season in the NIT, going 2–1 as the interim coach. Groce went 18–14 over the first 32 games.

Notes

Illinois

Illinois Fighting Illini basketball seasons